Clupeiformes  is the order of ray-finned fish that includes the herring family, Clupeidae, and the anchovy family, Engraulidae. The group includes many of the most important forage and food fish.

Clupeiformes are physostomes, which means that their gas bladder has a pneumatic duct connecting it to the gut. They typically lack a lateral line, but still have the eyes, fins and scales that are common to most fish, though not all fish have these attributes. They are generally silvery fish with streamlined, spindle-shaped, bodies, and they often school. Most species eat plankton which they filter from the water with their gill rakers.

The former order of Isospondyli was subsumed mostly by Clupeiformes, but some isospondylous fishes (isospondyls) were assigned to Osteoglossiformes, Salmoniformes, Cetomimiformes, etc.

Families
 
The order includes about 405 species in seven families:
 Order Clupeiformes
 Suborder Denticipitoidei
 Family Denticipitidae (denticle herring)
 Suborder Clupeoidei
 Family Engraulidae (anchovies)
 Subfamily Coiliinae
 Subfamily Engraulinae
 Family Spratelloididae
 Family Pristigasteridae (longfin herrings)
 Subfamily Pristigasterinae
 Subfamily Pelloninae
 Family Chirocentridae (wolf herrings)
 Family Dussumieriidae (round herrings)
 Family Clupeidae [incl. Sundasalangidae) (herrings, sardines, shads, and menhadens)
 Subfamily Clupeinae
 Subfamily Ehiravinae
 Subfamily Alosinae
 Subfamily Dorosomatinae
 Subfamily Pellonulinae

Timeline of genera

References

 

 
Ray-finned fish orders
Taxa named by Pieter Bleeker